Lusigny-sur-Barse is a commune in the Aube department in the northeastern Grand Est region of France. In 2019, it had a population of 2,207.

Geography
The Barse flows through the commune.

The most recognisable building in Lusigny, throughout France (and abroad), is undoubtedly its railway station. Reproduced in miniature by the firm Jouef (maker of HO gauge electric trains, now a subsidiary of Hornby), the building gave hours of happiness to several generations of French children. The station was closed by the SNCF in the 1990s.

Demographics

See also
 Communes of the Aube department
 Parc naturel régional de la Forêt d'Orient

References

Communes of Aube
Aube communes articles needing translation from French Wikipedia